Marcus Parker (born May 18, 1983 in Dallas, Texas) is a professional American and Canadian football defensive lineman who is currently a free agent. He was signed by the Detroit Lions as an undrafted free agent in 2006. He played college football at New Mexico.

Parker also played for the Calgary Stampeders

External links
New Mexico Lobos Bio
Calgary Stampeders One-on One Video Footage

1983 births
Living people
People from Dallas
American players of Canadian football
Canadian football defensive linemen
New Mexico Lobos football players
Detroit Lions players
Calgary Stampeders players
Chicago Rush players